Baking It is an American baking reality competition television series that premiered on Peacock on December 2, 2021.

Cast 
 Maya Rudolph
 Andy Samberg (season 1)
 Amy Poehler (season 2)

Production 
On May 13, 2021, it was announced that Peacock had ordered a six-part cooking spin-off of Making It. On August 24, 2021, it was announced that Maya Rudolph and Andy Samberg would host the series. On October 28, 2021, it was announced that the series would premiere on December 2, 2021.

On October 25, 2022, it was announced that the series was renewed for a second season, which premiered on December 12, 2022. Additionally, Amy Poehler replaced Samberg as co-host.

Contestant progress

Episodes

Series overview

Season 1 (2021)

Season 2 (2022–23)

Special (2022)

Reception 
In 2022, the writers of the series (Neil Casey, Jessica McKenna, Zach Reino, and Niccole Thurman) won the Writers Guild of America Award in the category "Quiz and Audience Participation".

References

External links 
 
 

2020s American cooking television series
2020s American reality television series
2021 American television series debuts
American television spin-offs
English-language television shows
Food reality television series
Peacock (streaming service) original programming
Reality television spin-offs
Television series by 3 Arts Entertainment
Television series by Paper Kite Productions
Television series by Universal Television